Luís Santos (born 30 June 1955) is a Portuguese International Master chess player born in Lisbon. He won the Portuguese Chess Championship in 1978, 1979 and 1982.

In 1980 he played International Master Francisco Trois at Vigo in Spain. His opponent took two hours and 20 minutes considering two possible knight moves for his 7th move, which the chess.com website records as one of the slowest moves ever.

Santos was awarded the title of International Master (IM) in 1986
and International Correspondence Chess Grandmaster (ICCGM) in 1990.

References

External links
Personal website
Games on 365chess.com

Chess International Masters
Portuguese chess players
Sportspeople from Lisbon
1955 births
Living people